Luke Donaldson (born 20 May 2000 in New Zealand) is a New Zealand rugby union player who plays for Canterbury. His playing position is scrum-half.

Reference list

External links
itsrugby.co.uk profile

2000 births
People educated at St Paul's College, Auckland
New Zealand rugby union players
Living people
Rugby union scrum-halves
Canterbury rugby union players
Rugby union players from Auckland
Bay of Plenty rugby union players